Chilcotin, meaning "people of the red ochre river" may refer to:
The Tsilhqot'in (also called the Chilcotin), an Athabaskan First Nations people of British Columbia, Canada
Chilcotin language, the language spoken by the Tsilhqot'in
The Chilcotin Country, a region in British Columbia also known as "the Chilcotin"
The Chilcotin River, a river in British Columbia
Chilcotin Lake, a lake in British Columbia
The Chilcotin War of 1864
Fort Chilcotin, a 19th-century outpost of the Hudson's Bay Company
The Chilcotin Ranges, a group of mountain ranges in British Columbia
Chilcotin Plateau, a subplateau of the Fraser Plateau in British Columbia
Chilcotin Group, a volcanic formation in British Columbia
Chilcotin Forest, a community west of Williams Lake, British Columbia
Coast Chilcotin, a Canadian federal electoral district, 1968-1979
Cariboo—Chilcotin, a Canadian federal electoral district, 1979-2003
Cariboo Chilcotin Coast, a regional-marketing division of Tourism British Columbia
Chilcotin (sternwheeler), a paddle steamer from the upper Fraser River in British Columbia
Canadian Forces Camp Chilcotin, a Canadian Forces training camp in the Chilcotin District
Chilcoten, later Chilcotin, was the original post office name for Riske Creek, British Columbia

Chilcotin Country